The Sun Kudumbam Awards is an awards ceremony held to honour the cast and crew of the television serials which air on Sun TV, presented by Sun Network. The first awards ceremony happened in 2010 and it is a biennial award ceremony.

Nominations 
The top four performances in all serials, including the serials that have ended the past year, in different categories are chosen by jurors. During February and March, the nominees are interviewed on Sun TV and viewers are asked to cast their votes by text messaging their favourite actor in each category. The actor receiving the highest votes are proclaimed winner of the award in that category.

Technical awards are given to backstage technicians, such as screenwriters and directors, by Sun Network and are not chosen by viewers.

Awards

General awards 
 Best Overall Performance Award
The Sun Kudumbam Best Overall Performance Award is given by Sun Network as part of its annual Sun Kudumbam Awards for artistes in television serials aired on Sun TV.

 Special Jury Award
 Best Serial Award
 Lifetime Achievement Award
 Natchathira Special Award

Performance awards 
 Best Actor
 Best Actress
 Best Supporting Actor
 Best Supporting Actress
 Best Brother
 Best Sister
 Best Father
 Best Mother
 Best Mamiyar
 Best Mamanar
 Best Male Villain
 Best Female Villain

Technical Awards 
 Best Serial
 Best Director
 Best Screenwriter
 Best Dialogue Writer
 Best Cinematographer
 Best Music Director
 Best Editor

Sun Kudumbam Viruthugal 2010

The Sun Kudumbam Awards 2010 were given for 22 categories, of which there were 8 main awards, 8 performance awards and 6 technical awards. The nominations and victories were based on votes via text messaging. The award ceremony was hosted by actress Kasthuri and Rishi.

Thirumathi Selvam won 10 awards including Best Serial. Other winners were Arasi  and Best Director V. Thiru Selvam for Kolangal with five awards, Thangam with three awards and Sivasakthi and Metti Oli with one.

Sun Kudumbam Viruthugal 2012
The second edition of Sun Kudumbam Viruthugal 2012 was held on end December 2012. The award ceremony was hosted by actor Deepak Dinkar and Aishwarya. Actress Raadhika Sarathkumar won Lifetime Achievement Award 

Winners are listed first and highlighted in boldface.

Sun Kudumbam Viruthugal 2014
The third edition of Sun Kudumbam Viruthugal 2014 was aired as two parts wherein the Part 1 of the awards night to be telecast this Sunday 30 November 2014 from 6.00 PM onwards and Part 2 by the succeeding Sunday 7 December 2014 in the same time band. The awards consists of 26 categories with 4 nominations each in various categories for the artists and technicians. Deepak Dinkar and Devadarshini as the Host.

Many Kollywood celebs including Andrea Jeremiah, Shiva, Sanchita Shetty, Raai Laxmi, Pooja Umashankar and Vishakha Singh will be a part of the show.

Sun Kudumbam Virudhugal 2018 
The fourth edition of Sun Kudumbam Viruthugal 2018 was held on end December 2018. The award ceremony was hosted by RJ Vigneshkanth and Nakshathra

Sun Kudumbam Virudhugal 2019 
The fifth edition of Sun Kudumbam Viruthugal 2019 was held on end 5 January 2020 on Sunday at 6:30pm . The award ceremony was hosted by Athulya and Aadhavan.

Sun Kudumbam Virudhugal 2022 
The sixth edition of Sun Kudumbam Viruthugal 2022 was aired as two parts wherein the Part 1 of the awards night to be telecast this Sunday 17 April 2022 from 6.30 PM onwards and Part 2 by the succeeding Sunday 24 April 2022 in the same time band. Sathish and Dhanya Balakrishna as the Host.

See also 

 List of Asian television awards
 Sun Kudumbam Awards 2010
 Vijay Television Awards
 Zee Tamil Kudumbam Viruthugal

References

 
Tamil-language television awards
2010 Tamil-language television series debuts